The Saviem S is a range of medium-duty trucks manufactured by the French manufacturer Saviem between 1964 and 1967.

History
The S range was introduced in 1964 and originally consisted of two models using the 710 cab: the Saviems S5 (5-tonne payload) and  S7 (7-tonne payload). Later, Saviem expanded the range, unveiling two new models at the 1964 Paris Motor Show: the S8 (8-tonne payload) and the S9 (9-tonne payload). In 1966, the company introduced the S6 (6-tonne payload). The S range was replaced in 1967 by the SM range, although evolutions of the S5 (S5B and C) and the S9 were still produced afterwards. FAR converted S trucks, the resulting models being called SD (SD5, SD8).

Technical details
The suspension of the four trucks have leaf springs on both axles. Brakes are hydraulic  (S5)  and air brakes (S7 and S8).They have a five-speed "synchromesh" manual gearbox and a gammer worm and roller steering system.  

The truck has a six-speed "synchromesh" manual gearbox. As the other S models, the S9 has a leaf spring suspension and a gammer worm and roller steering.

References

Vehicles introduced in 1964
Saviem